Percell McGahee Gaskins (born April 25, 1972) is a former American football linebacker. He played college football at Kansas State. He was drafted by the St. Louis Rams in the 4th round (105th overall) of the 1996 NFL draft.

College career
While at Kansas State, Gaskins was a three-year starter between 1993 and 1995.

Professional career

St. Louis Rams
Gaskins was selected in the 4th round (105th overall) by the St. Louis Rams. As a rookie, he appeared in 15 games starting one. For the season he recorded 21 tackles and one fumble recovery.

Carolina Panthers
After being waived by the Rams after one season, Gaskins was claimed by the Carolina Panthers on August 26, 1997. In the 1997, Gaskins appeared in 12 games recording three tackles. He was cut by the Panthers on August 25, 1998.

Coaching career
In 2014, Gaskins was named the head coach for the Garinger High School football team. After going 0-21 in two seasons, he resigned as head coach.

References

Living people
1972 births
American football linebackers
Kansas State Wildcats football players
St. Louis Rams players
Carolina Panthers players
Players of American football from Florida
Sportspeople from Daytona Beach, Florida